Longing for Old Virginia: Their Complete Victor Recordings (1934) is a compilation of recordings made by American country music group the Carter Family, released in 1998. It is the eighth of nine compilations released by Rounder Records of the group's Victor recordings. The original Carter Family group consisting of Alvin Pleasant "A.P." Delaney Carter, his wife Sara Dougherty Carter, and his sister-in-law Maybelle Addington Carter recorded many of what would become their signature songs for Victor Records.

The tracks have all been digitally remastered and include liner notes by country music historian Charles K. Wolfe.

Reception 
In his Allmusic review, music critic Jim Smith said the release "... may not be the definitive Carter Family material, but they are all outstanding... Consistently enjoyable listening." Kels Koch called it "Pure as a mountain stream and heartfelt as the day is long, these vintage performances encompass the evolution of an American songwriting tradition at its finest. From gospel to vaudeville to bluegrass, the roots of the Carter Family run deep and wide." In his Country Standard Time review, critic Roy Kasten states "Like the preceding volume, most selections here are not the stuff of Greatest Hits, and for that they're especially worth savoring. Like the other seven volumes, these last CDs are essential to any country music lover's collection."

Track listing  
All songs are credited to A. P. Carter.
 "Darling Daisies" – 2:58
 "East Virginia Blues" – 2:44
 "Lover's Return" – 3:04
 "It'll Aggravate Your Soul" – 3:26
 "Hello Central, Give Me Heaven" – 3:31
 "I'm Working on a Building" – 2:41
 "On a Hill Lone and Gray" – 2:33
 "You've Been Fooling Me, Baby" – 2:57
 "Longing for Old Virginia" – 2:58
 "March Winds Gonna Blow My Blues All Away" – 2:43
 "There'll Be Joy, Joy, Joy" – 2:45
 "Home in Tennessee" – 2:32
 "Are You Tired of Me, My Darling?" – 2:52
 "I Cannot Be Your Sweetheart" – 2:56
 "My Heart's Tonight in Texas" – 2:44
 "There's No Hiding Place Down Here" – 2:53
 "The Cowboy's Wild Song to His Herd" – 2:24
 "The Evening Bells Are Ringing" – 3:07

Personnel 
A. P. Carter – vocals
Maybelle Carter – vocals, guitar, autoharp
Sara Carter – vocals, autoharp
Production notes:
Ralph Peer – producer
David Glasser – mastering
Scott Billington – design
Charles K. Wolfe – liner notes

References

External links 
The Carter Family: A Comprehensive Discography

Carter Family albums
1998 compilation albums
Rounder Records compilation albums